Highway 99A is a series of former highways in the southwestern part of British Columbia, Canada. It was the designation of the former 1942 alignment of Highway 99 as well a various alternate routes which existed in the 1950s and 1960s. The last official use of '99A' was decommissioned in 2006, although some present-day, commercially published road maps still show it and some remnant signage still remains.

King George Highway / Kingsway

Prior to that, the four-lane, divided "Deas (Island) Throughway" which was completed to the U.S. border in 1962, was designated Highway 499. Highway 99A was decommissioned by the province in 2006 and the city of Surrey renamed "King George Highway" to "King George Boulevard" in 2009, although, as of July 2021, the Ministry of Transportation keeps two minor segments of the former route maintained in its inventory.

Route description 

Highway 99A started in Surrey at the first exit off Highway 99 north of the Peace Arch and followed the King George Highway. Originally to be named the Peace Arch Highway, it was dedicated officially on October 16, 1940 as the King George VI Highway after the royal visit of 1939. The highway served as a route for commuters travelling to New Westminster, Burnaby, and Vancouver. The highway continued north for another  to Fraser Highway, where it merged with Highway 1A.

In New Westminster, Highway 99A followed McBride Boulevard and 10th Avenue, then onto Kingsway, where the highway entered Burnaby. Highway 99A then proceeded west-northwest for  through the City of Burnaby to its intersection with Boundary Road, at which point the highway crossed into Vancouver.

Major intersections

Footnotes

Pacific Highway

Between 1942 and 1962, the King George Highway was designated Highway 99, while the Highway 99A designation was given to the older Pacific Highway after it became the alternate U.S. border route. The highway began at the Pacific Highway Border Crossing near the locality of Douglas (now part of Surrey) and continued north to Cloverdale, where it shared the alignment with the Highway 1 (present-day Fraser Highway) to the King George Highway (Highway 99). In 1958, the Pacific Highway was redesignated as Highway 15.

Grandview Highway

Between 1942 and 1962, the Grandview Highway was designated as Highway 99A, serving as an alternate route to Kingsway between Pattullo Bridge and Vancouver. From the bridge in New Westminster, Highway 99A followed McBride Boulevard and 8th Avenue to 8th Street (at the time, Highway 1/99 followed Columbia Street and 12th Street though downtown New Westminster to Kingsway). After crossing 10th Avenue, Highway 99A entered into Burnaby and become Grandview Highway (sometimes referred to as the Douglas-Grandview Highway as it was known as Douglas Road prior to 1926).  At Boundary Road, Grandview Highway turned north for a few blocks before turning west and entering Vancouver, where it travelled in a west-northwest direction along Grandview Highway North to Clarke Drive, where Highway 99A followed Clarke Drive to the Grandview Viaduct and Terminal Avenue, rejoining Highway 1/99 at Main Street near the Pacific Central Station.

Highway 401 was constructed to the north of Grandview Highway and opened in 1964, replacing Highway 99A as a regional east-west highway, and the route was reverted to the respective local municipalities. In 1968, the Douglas-Grandview Highway was renamed Canada Way in honour of the Canadian Centennial which was a year earlier. Vancouver also later prioritized Grandview Highway to follow Grandview Highway South and connect with 12th Avenue, while Grandview Highway North experienced a series of traffic calming measures, which includes carrying a portion of the SkyTrain's Expo Line and later conversion to a greenway and bikeway.

References

099A
099A